Mizuho Katayama (born 27 November 1969) is a synchronized swimming coach in Japan. After her retirement from the South Korean national team, she married and began using her current name.

Early life 
Katayama is a third-generation Korean resident of Japan and was born in Izumiōtsu, Osaka Prefecture. Her only given name since birth has been the Japanese given name Mizuho; her legal birth surname was Kim, while she used the Japanese name Mizuho Kōchi as a pass name. She went on to attend  in Takaishi. She entered the Osaka University of Health and Sport Sciences in 1987.

Career 
She competed in Japanese national championships, but could not represent Japan in international competition because she was not a Japanese citizen. She competed under the name Kim Mijinsu, where "Mijinsu" is the Korean pronunciation of the characters she used at the time for her given name Mizuho. She came in 27th place in the women's solo with a score of 86.350, and in 10th place in the women's duet competitions with a score of 89.500. She again represented South Korea in the duet routine at the 1991 World Aquatics Championships with partner Choe Jeong-yun, and placed thirteenth. She placed first in the duet routine at the 1991  with partner Chiaki Yamamura.

After her wedding in 1993 to a Japanese man from Hiroshima, she used the married name Mizuho Katayama. She moved to Hiroshima, and became an instructor at the Hiroshima Synchronized Swimming Club, a board member of the Hiroshima Prefectural Swimming Federation, and a synchronized swimming referee for the National Sports Festival of Japan. She was later the head coach for Japan's junior synchronized swimming team at the Asia Swimming Federation's 2007 Asian Age Group Championships in Jakarta, Indonesia and the 2008 FINA World Junior Synchronised Swimming Championships in Saint Petersburg, Russia. She was promoted to head coach of Japan's national synchronized swimming team for the 2009 World Aquatics Championships in Rome, Italy.

References

External links 
 Video of Kim and her partner Ha Su-gyeong practicing on 1 August 1988, via Munhwa Broadcasting Corporation 

1969 births
Living people
South Korean synchronized swimmers
Olympic synchronized swimmers of South Korea
Sportspeople from Osaka Prefecture
Synchronized swimmers at the 1988 Summer Olympics
South Korean expatriate sportspeople in Japan
Zainichi Korean people
People from Izumiōtsu, Osaka